Henri Jacques William Pescarolo (born 25 September 1942) is a former racing driver from France. He competed in the 24 Hours of Le Mans a record 33 times, winning on four occasions, and won a number of other major sports car events including the 24 Hours of Daytona. He also participated in 64 Formula One World Championship Grands Prix, achieving one podium and 12 championship points. Pescarolo also drove in the Dakar Rally in the 1990s, before retiring from racing at the age of 57. In 2000 he set up his eponymous racing team, Pescarolo Sport, which competed in Le Mans until 2013. He wore a distinctive green helmet, and wears a full-face beard that partially covers burns suffered in a crash.

Early career and Formula One

Born in Montfermeil near Paris, Pescarolo began his career in 1965 with a Lotus Seven. He was successful enough to be offered a third car in the Matra Formula 3 team for 1966, but the car was not ready until mid-season. However, in 1967 he won the European Championship with Matra and was promoted to Formula 2 for 1968. That season he was team-mate to Jean-Pierre Beltoise and achieved several second places and a win at Albi, which led to him being given a drive in Matra's Formula One team for the last three races of 1968.

His career suffered a setback, in 1969, when he crashed on the Mulsanne Straight at Le Mans whilst testing the Matra sports car. Pescarolo was badly burned and did not compete again until mid-season. He returned at the German GP where he drove a Formula 2 Matra into fifth place winning the small capacity class, in his only Grand Prix race that season.

For 1970 Pescarolo was signed full-time by Matra for their Formula One team and once again as team-mate to Beltoise, put in a solid season with a third place at the Monaco Grand Prix being the high point. He also won the Paris 1000 km and Buenos Aires 1000 km sports car races partnered with Beltoise. Pescarolo was not retained by Matra, and in 1971, 1972, and 1973 with Motul sponsorship, he drove for the fledgling Formula One team run by the young Frank Williams, but with little success. In 1974, Pescarolo drove for BRM, again with Motul backing, but the team's best days were gone and a ninth place in Argentina was his best result in a season with many retirements.

Pescarolo did not compete in Formula One in 1975 but returned to the championship in 1976 with a Surtees privately entered by BS Fabrications. Although neither car nor driver was considered to be competitive, failing to qualify for 2 of 9 Grands Prix entered, Pescarolo did begin to show speed in the final 5 races, even scoring a season's best finish of 9th at the 1976 Austrian Grand Prix.

Career after Formula One – sportscars

After Pescarolo's retirement from Formula One, he went on to start his own team, which competed until 2012 in the Le Mans Endurance Series and the 24 Hours of Le Mans, which he won as a driver four times (1972, 1973, 1974 and 1984). His team, Pescarolo Sport, was notably sponsored by Sony's PlayStation 2 and by Gran Turismo 4. During the five years that Pescarolo has campaigned Courage C60 prototypes, so many modifications have been made to the model that Courage allowed the team to name the car after themselves, such was the differences between their model and the standard C60. In 2005, it was developed further still to meet the "hybrid" regulations, before the change to LMP1/2 format.

In 1977, 1978 and 1979 Pescarolo drove in Australia's most famous motor race, the Bathurst 1000 for touring cars held at the Mount Panorama Circuit, driving on all three occasions with 1974 race winner John Goss. Unfortunately all races resulted in a DNF for the Goss built Ford XC Falcon GS500 Hardtops, completing only 113 laps (of 163) in 1977, 68 in 1978 and 118 in 1979. The 1977 race saw Pescarolo's Le Mans rival Jacky Ickx win the race in a semi-works Falcon driving with Allan Moffat.

Pescarolo holds the record for Le Mans starts with 33 and has won the race on four occasions as a driver. He has yet to win the race as a team owner, coming very close in 2005 with the Pescarolo C60H.  His team did manage to win the LMES championship in the same year. His team was also second at Le Mans in 2006, followed by a third in 2007 behind a pair of diesel-powered prototypes.

Pescarolo drove the Dakar Rally in the 1990s, and is also a keen helicopter pilot.

Racing record

24 Hours of Le Mans results

Complete European Formula Two Championship results
(key) (Races in bold indicate pole position; races in italics indicate fastest lap)

 Graded drivers not eligible for  European Formula Two Championship points

Complete Formula One World Championship results
(key) (Races in italics indicate fastest lap)

Non-Championship Formula One results
(key)

Major race results 
 24 hours of Daytona : 1st, 1991
 1000 km Buenos Aires : 1st, 1970
 6 Hours of Nürburgring : 1st, 1986
 Brands Hatch 1000 km : 1st, 1971
 1000 km Zeltweg : 1st, 1972, 1974, 1975
 Dijon 1000 km : 1st, 1972, 1978, 1979
 6 Hours of Imola : 1st, 1974
 Spa 1000 km : 1st, 1975
 Suzuka 10 Hours : 1st, 1981
 1000 km Monza : 1st, 1982
 6 Hours of Vallelunga : 1st, 1972, 1978
 6 Hours of Kyalami : 1st, 1974
 6 Hours of Watkins Glen : 1st, 1972, 1974, 1975
 Interserie Siegerland : 1st, 1984
 1000 km of Paris : 1st, 1969, 1994

References

See also

 Pescarolo Sport

1942 births
Living people
French racing drivers
French Formula One drivers
European Formula Two Championship drivers
French Formula Three Championship drivers
French people of Italian descent
24 Hours of Le Mans drivers
24 Hours of Le Mans winning drivers
12 Hours of Reims drivers
Matra Formula One drivers
Williams Formula One drivers
March Formula One drivers
BRM Formula One drivers
BS Fabrications Formula One drivers
World Sportscar Championship drivers
Porsche Motorsports drivers
Team Joest drivers
La Filière drivers
Sports car racing team owners
Jaguar Racing drivers
Larbre Compétition drivers
Graff Racing drivers
Team LeMans drivers
Sauber Motorsport drivers